The following lists events that happened during  1951 in New Zealand.

The year was dominated by the 1951 New Zealand waterfront dispute.

New Zealand entered a mutual defence pact with the United States and Australia – ANZUS.

Population
A New Zealand census was held in 1951.

 Estimated population as of 31 December: 1,970,500
 Increase since 31 December 1950: 42,800 (2.22%)
 Males per 100 females: 100.9

Incumbents

Regal and viceregal
Head of State – George VI
Governor-General – Lieutenant-General The Lord Freyberg VC GCMG KCB KBE DSO

Government
The 29th New Zealand Parliament continued. In power was the National government under Sidney Holland. The general election saw the governing National Party re-elected with a twenty-seat margin, a substantial improvement on the twelve-seat margin it previously held.

The New Zealand Legislative Council voted itself out of existence, making New Zealand a unicameral democracy.

Speaker of the House – Mathew Oram
Prime Minister – Sidney Holland
Deputy Prime Minister – Keith Holyoake
Minister of Finance – Sidney Holland
Minister of Foreign Affairs – Frederick Doidge then Clifton Webb
Chief Justice — Sir Humphrey O'Leary

Parliamentary opposition 
 Leader of the Opposition –  Vacant until 17 January, then Walter Nash (Labour).

Main centre leaders
Mayor of Auckland – John Allum
Mayor of Hamilton – Harold Caro
Mayor of Wellington – Robert Macalister
Mayor of Christchurch – Robert Macfarlane
Mayor of Dunedin – Len Wright

Events 
The Official Secrets Act is passed.
 15 February: The start of the "1951 Waterfront dispute" a massive labor strike lasting for 151 days.
 1 September: Signing of the ANZUS treaty.

Arts and literature

See 1951 in art, 1951 in literature, :Category:1951 books

Music

See: 1951 in music

Radio and television

 Experimental television broadcasts had been allowed from 1951 (as long as they included nothing that could be classed as 'entertainment'). 

See: Public broadcasting in New Zealand

Film

See: :Category:1951 film awards, 1951 in film, List of New Zealand feature films, Cinema of New Zealand, :Category:1951 films

Sport

Athletics
 George Bromley wins his fourth national title in the men's marathon, clocking 2:48:16 on 3 March in Wellington.

Chess
 The 58th National Chess Championship was held in Christchurch, and was won by D.I. Lynch of Hastings.

Horse racing

Harness racing
 New Zealand Trotting Cup – Van Dieman
 Auckland Trotting Cup – Soangetaha

Lawn bowls
The national outdoor lawn bowls championships are held in Wellington.
 Men's singles champion – A. Graham (Johnsonville Bowling Club)
 Men's pair champions – G.G. Littlejohn, A.J. Webster (skip) (Hutt Bowling Club)
 Men's fours champions – A.J. Murdoch, H.L. Rule, A. Rivers, Pete Skoglund (skip) (Otahuhu Bowling Club)

Rugby league
The 1951 French rugby league tour of Australia and New Zealand is conducted

Rugby union
 Bledisloe Cup: New Zealand beat Australia in all three tests, winning back the cup.
 Ranfurly Shield: North Auckland defended the shield against Bay of Plenty (16–12) and Thames Valley (19–6) before losing it to Waikato (3–6). Waikato then defended successfully against Auckland (14–6), Bay of Plenty (32–10), Taranaki (21–12) and Wanganui (14–0).

Shooting
 Ballinger Belt – Maurie Gordon (Okawa)

Soccer
 The New Zealand national soccer team played 9 matches, 6 of them internationals:
 11 August, Wellington: NZ 3 – 1 Victoria (Australia)
 10 September, Auckland: NZ 2 – 0 Auckland
 15 September, Suva: NZ 6 – 1 Suva
 19 September, Nouméa: NZ 0 – 2 New Caledonia
 22 September, Nouméa: NZ 6 – 4 New Caledonia
 24 September, Nouméa: NZ 0 – 2 New Caledonia
 30 September, Nouméa: NZ 3 – 1 New Caledonia
 4 October, Nouméa: NZ 9 – 0	New Hebrides
 7 October, Suva: NZ 6 – 4 Fiji
 The Chatham Cup is won by Eastern Suburbs of Auckland who beat Northern of Dunedin 5— 1in the final.
 Provincial league champions:
	Auckland: Eastern Suburbs AFC
	Buller:	Millerton Thistle
	Canterbury:	Technical OB
	Hawke's Bay:	Napier HSOB
	Manawatu:	St Andrews
	Nelson:	Thistle
	Northland:	Kamo Swifts
	Otago:	Northern AFC
	Poverty Bay:	Thistle
	South Canterbury:	Northern Hearts
	Southland:	Brigadiers
	Taranaki:	Old Boys
	Waikato:	Claudelands Rovers, Rotowaro (shared)
	Wanganui:	Technical College Old Boys
	Wellington:	Seatoun AFC
	West Coast:	Runanga

Births
 8 January: Garry Moore, mayor of Christchurch.
 24 January Dianne Macaskill, former Chief Archivist of Archives New Zealand
 21 February: John Parker, cricketer.
 6 March: Maurice Williamson, politician, cabinet minister
 29 March: Geoff Howarth, cricketer.
 22 June: Todd Hunter, musician.
 3 July: Richard Hadlee, cricketer.
 21 July: (in Fiji) Bernie Fraser, rugby player.
 14 August: Vern Hanaray, road cyclist.
 14 September: Karen Plummer, cricketer.
 20 September: Stephen Boock, cricketer.
 27 October: Rick Barker, politician.
 16 November: Andy Dalton, rugby player.
 21 November: Joe Karam, rugby union and rugby league player, lobbyist.
 8 December: Paul Brydon, road and track cyclist.
 9 December: Tuariki Delamere, politician.
 20 December: Paul Swain, politician
 Geoff Cochrane, poet and novelist (died 2022)
 Marty Johnstone, drug trafficker ('Mr Asia')
 Stephen Tindall, business leader

Deaths
 9 January: William "Massa" Johnston, rugby and rugby league player.
 16 July: Charles Tilleard Natusch, architect
 4 November: Oscar Natzka, opera singer.
 1 December: Te Rangi Hīroa, Māori leader (born 1877)

See also
List of years in New Zealand
Timeline of New Zealand history
History of New Zealand
Military history of New Zealand
Timeline of the New Zealand environment
Timeline of New Zealand's links with Antarctica

References

External links

 
Years of the 20th century in New Zealand